Following is a list of senators of Côte-d'Or, people who have represented the department of Côte-d'Or in the Senate of France.

Third Republic

Senators for Côte-d'Or under the French Third Republic were:

 Claude Lacomme (1876–1885)
 Charles Mazeau (1876–1903)
 Louis Hugot (1885–1907)
 Pierre Joigneaux (1891–1894)
 Eugène Spuller (1892–1896) 
 Edme Piot (1897–1903)
 Henri Ricard (1903–1910)
 Anatole Philipot (1907–1921)
 Claude Chauveau (1910–1945)
 Ernest Messner (1910–1921)
 Pierre Jossot (1920–1941)
 Auguste Montenot (1921–1935)
 Émile Vincent (1936–1945)

Fourth Republic

Senators for Côte-d'Or under the French Fourth Republic were:

Henri Guénin (1946–1948)
Roger Duchet (1946–1959)
Bénigne Fournier (1948–1959)
Étienne Viallanesh (1957–1959)

Fifth Republic 
Senators for Côte-d'Or under the French Fifth Republic:

References

Sources

 
Lists of members of the Senate (France) by department